Per-Olov Ahrén (1926 in Forserum, Småland, Sweden – 22 March 2004) was a Swedish clergyman who served as bishop of Lund from 1980 to 1992.

See also
List of bishops of Lund

1926 births
2004 deaths
People from Nässjö Municipality
Lutheran bishops of Lund
20th-century Lutheran bishops